Shantinatha temple, Ramtek is a major Jain  (pilgrimage site) in the Indian state of Maharashtra, located between the villages of Ramtek in Nagpur district.

About temple 
Shantinatha temple is situated near the Fort and Rama temple. The temple was constructed in the 11th—12th century. The temple has undergone renovations, and new shrines were added to the temple complex. The temple is a yellow sandstone structure and is considered an excellent example of North Indian architecture. The main shrine houses an  idol of Shantinatha. The sub-shrines were erected in 18th—19th century by an accountant serving in the court of House of Bhonsle during the reign of Raghoji I Bhonsle.

See also 
 Gajpanth
 Kumbhoj

References

Citation

Bibliography

Books

External links

Jain temples in Maharashtra
11th-century Jain temples